The Warren Centre for Advanced Engineering is an Australian engineering and science policy think-tank, established in 1983 and named for Australia's first engineering lecturer. The Sydney-based centre describes itself as Australia’s premier independent think-tank on transformative engineering issues.

The Warren Centre is known for its annual Innovation Lectures and Innovation Hero Awards, which celebrate important figures in Australian innovation. It is influential in STEM (science, technology, engineering and maths) education policy, and is known for other historical and ongoing programs across different branches of engineering.

History
The Warren Centre was founded in 1983 to mark the centenary of Australia’s first university engineering lecture, delivered by William Henry Warren at the University of Sydney in 1883.

There were 20 founding members of the Committee, including six Professors of the Engineering Faculty and engineers from a wide range of industry backgrounds. The Centre raised an initial AU$2 million endowment (AU$10 million in 2013 currency ) from a range of major Australian engineering companies and private donors. Its founding aim was to ‘foster engineering excellence around Australia to create wealth’.

Over the following 30 years, The Warren Centre has had a significant impact on Australian engineering, including programs such as Winning By Design, Fire Safety & Engineering, Underground Space, Sustainable Transport in Sustainable Cities, and Low Energy High Rise, which have influenced the way industry, government and other stakeholders consider major engineering issues.

Since 1996, The Warren Centre has hosted an annual Innovation Lecture series presented by a leading figure in Australian science or engineering on their achievements, including the creation of Cochlear, Google Maps, Maptek and the Virgin Galactic space program.

Current work
Current projects at The Warren Center include mobilizing PPIR, off-grid power solutions (including small modular nuclear reactors), construction performance, quality and waste reduction, and urban reform.

The Warren Centre’s STEM education work is focused on influencing Commonwealth and state governments, as well as other players, on improving Australia’s science, technology, engineering, and math education. It also includes working with undergraduate and graduate students at Australian universities to commercialize innovative projects—for example, the parcel delivery drone service. 

In its public policy work, the Warren Center is an advocate of improved engineering leadership and commercialization, as well as supporting improvements in public transport and urban design, and a greater focus on renewable energy. The Warren Centre helps fund a Chair in Innovation at the University of Sydney. Professor Andy Dong is currently in charge of this chair.

Innovation lectures
The Warren Centre's annual Innovation Lecture program has been running since 1996 with the first presenter, John Bertrand, with other speakers including BHP's Jerry Ellis, Cochlear's Catherine Livingstone, Aimtek's Don Fry, Google's Dr Lars Rasmussen, Professor Hugh F. Durrant-Whyte, Maptek's Dr Bob Johnson, Australian Chief Defence Scientist Dr Alex Zelinsky, and Virgin Galactic's The Spaceship Company Director of Operations Enrico Palermo.

The annual lecture series consists of several dates across Australia's major cities. The lecture series is tied in with The Warren Centre's annual Innovation Hero Awards, which also showcase prominent Australian innovators. 2013's Innovation Hero Award winners were Michael Hammer, Philip Wilson and Hugh Stevenson from Agilent Technologies, who developed the Agilent 4100 series microwave plasma atomic emission spectrometer.

The Innovation Lecture replaced the other longstanding prestigious annual event of The Warren Centre, the Rolls-Royce_Qantas Award for Engineering Excellence.

Board and directors

 Richard Kell AM, Chair
 Kathy Jones, Co-Deputy Chair (KJA)
 Professor Mike Dureau AM, Co-Deputy Chair 
 Ashley Brinson, Executive Director
 Ian Dart (Logical Technologies Pty Ltd)
 Christopher Janssen (GPC Electronics Pty Ltd)
 Professor Ron Johnston 
 Dr John Lear (JBL Consulting) 
 Bob Rollinson (Salamander Technologies Pty Ltd)
 Fiona Mahony (Telstra)
 John Pickhaver (Macquarie Capital)
 Ian Oppermann (NSW Data Analytics Centre)
 Professor Willy Zwaenepoel (Dean of Engineering)

References

External links
 The Warren Centre website
 The Warren Centre at the University of Sydney
 The Warren Centre's Engineering Icons
 William Henry Warren at the Australian Dictionary of Biography

Think tanks based in Australia
Think tanks established in 1983